Hydrophosphination is the insertion of a carbon-carbon multiple bond into a phosphorus-hydrogen bond forming a new phosphorus-carbon bond.  Like other hydrofunctionalizations, the rate and regiochemistry of the insertion reaction is influenced by the catalyst.  Catalysts take many forms, but most prevalent are bases and free-radical initiators.

Acid-base routes
The usual application of hydrophosphination involves reactions of phosphine (PH3).  Typically base-catalysis allows addition of Michael acceptors such as acrylonitrile to give tris(cyanoethyl)phosphine:
PH3  +  3 CH2=CHZ  →  P(CH2CH2Z)3 (Z = NO2, CN, C(O)NH2)

Acid catalysis is applicable to hydrophosphination with alkenes that form stable carbocations.  These alkenes include isobutylene and many analogues:
PH3  +  R2C=CH2  →  R2(CH3)CPH2 (R = Me, alkyl, etc)
Bases catalyze the addition of secondary phosphines to vinyldiphenylphosphine:
HPR2  +  CH2=CHPR'2   →   R2PCH2CH2PR'2

Free-radical methods
Many hydrophosphination reactions are initiated by free-radicals.  AIBN and peroxides are typical initiators, as well as Ultraviolet irradiation.  In this way, the commercially important tributylphosphine and trioctylphosphine are prepared in good yields from 1-butene and 1-octene, respectively.

The reactions proceed by abstraction of an H atom the phosphine precursor, producing the phosphino radical, a seven electron species.  This radical then adds to the alkene, and subsequent H-atom transfer completes the cycle.  Some highly efficient hydrophosphinations appear not to proceed via radicals, but alternative explanations are lacking.

Metal-catalyzed reactions
Metal-catalyzed hydrophosphinations are not widely used, although they have been extensively researched.  Studies mainly focus on secondary and primary organophosphines (R2PH and RPH2, respectively). These substrates bind to metals, and the resulting adducts insert alkenes and alkynes into the P-H bonds via diverse mechanisms.

Early transition metal and lanthanide catalysts

Metal complexes of d0 configurations are effective catalysts for hydrophosphinations of simple alkenes and alkynes. Intramolecular reactions are facile, e.g. starting with α,ω-pentenylphosphine. The primary phosphine undergoes a  σ-bond metathesis with the bis(trimethylsilyl)methylene ligand forming the lanthanide-phosphido complex. Subsequently the pendant terminal alkene or alkyne inserts into the Ln-P bond. Finally, protonolysis of the Ln-C bond with the starting primary phosphine releases the new phosphine and regenerates the catalyst. Given that the metal is electron-poor, the M-C bond is sufficiently enough to be protonolyzed by the substrate primary phosphine.

Most metal catalyzed hydrophosphinations proceed via metal phosphido intermediates.  Some however proceed by metal-phosphinidene intermediates, i.e. species with M=PR double bonds. One such example is the Ti-catalyzed hydrophosphination of diphenylacetylene with phenylphosphine. This system involves a cationic catalyst precursor that is stabilized by the bulky 2,4,6-tri(isopropyl)phenyl- substituent on the phosphinidene and the close ionic association of methyltris(pentafluorophenyl)borate. This precursor undergoes exchange with phenylphosphine to give the titanium-phenylphosphinidene complex, which is the catalyst. The Ti=PPh species undergoes a [2+2] cycloaddition with diphenylacetylene to make the corresponding metallacyclobutene. The substrate, phenylphosphine, protonolyzes the Ti-C bond and after a proton shift regenerates the catalyst and releases the new phosphine.

Titanium-catalyzed 1,4-hydrophosphination of 1,3-dienes with diphenylphosphine has been demonstrated. It is a rare example of a d2 catalyst. In the first step, the Ti(II) precursor inserted in the P-H bond of diphenylphosphine (Ph2PH).

Late transition metal catalysts
Late transition metal hydrophosphination catalysts, i.e. those reliant on the nickel-triad and neighboring elements, generally require alkenes and alkynes with electron withdrawing substituents.  A strong base is required as a cocatalyst. 

Some late metal hydrophosphination catalysts proceed via oxidative addition of a P-H bond. For example, a Pt(0) catalyst undergoes oxidative addition of a secondary phosphine to form the corresponding hydrido Pt(II) phosphido complex. These systems catalyze hydrophosphination of acrylonitrile, although this reaction can be achieved without metal catalysts.  The key P-C bond-forming step occurs through an outer-sphere, Michael-type addition.

The usual mechanism for hydrophosphination for late metal catalysts involves insertion of the alkene into the metal-phosphorus bond. Insertion into the metal-hydrogen bond is also possible. The product phosphine is produced through reductive elimination of a P-C bond rather than a P-H bond in Glueck's system. The Ni(0) catalyst involves oxidation addition of a P-H bond to the metal, followed by insertion of the alkene into the M-H bond.

Hydrophosphorylation and related reactions
Utilizing phosphorus(V) precursors hydrophosphorylation entails the insertion of alkenes and alkynes into the P-H bonds of secondary phosphine oxides:
R2P(O)H  +  CH2=CHR  →   R2P(O)CH2CH2R
The reaction can be effected both using metal catalysts or free-radical initiators.

Further reading

References

Addition reactions
Green chemistry
Organophosphanes
Stoichiometry